Collins is a city in Tattnall County, Georgia, United States. The population was 584 at the 2010 census, up from 528 at the 2000 census.

History
A post office called Collins has been in operation since 1890. The Georgia General Assembly incorporated Collins as a town in 1894, and as a city in 1905. The community was named after Perry Collins, an early settler.

Geography
Collins is located at  (32.178748, -82.109979).

Demographics

As of the census of 2000, there were 528 people, 237 households, and 141 families residing in the city. The racial makeup of the city was 57.95% White, 41.29% African American, 0.19% from other races, and 0.57% from two or more races. Hispanic or Latino of any race were 0.38% of the population.

There were 237 households, out of which 26.6% had children under the age of 18 living with them, 36.7% were married couples living together, 20.3% had a female householder with no husband present, and 40.1% were non-families. 36.7% of all households were made up of individuals, and 18.6% had someone living alone who was 65 years of age or older.  The average household size was 2.23 and the average family size was 2.88.

In the city, the population was spread out, with 24.2% under the age of 18, 9.8% from 18 to 24, 23.3% from 25 to 44, 22.5% from 45 to 64, and 20.1% who were 65 years of age or older.  The median age was 39 years. For every 100 females, there were 74.3 males.  For every 100 females age 18 and over, there were 69.5 males.

The median income for a household in the city was $19,453, and the median income for a family was $23,500. Males had a median income of $27,917 versus $16,818 for females. The per capita income for the city was $14,120.  About 24.0% of families and 28.9% of the population were below the poverty line, including 38.8% of those under age 18 and 36.4% of those age 65 or over.

Education
Collins Elementary and Middle Schools are located at 720 and 720a on the northwest side of Main Street.  Over 300 elementary students and 100 middle schoolers attend the public schools, which are a part of the Tattnall County School System in Georgia.

References

External links
 County website
 Tattnall County Schools
 Tattnall County on state website
 Tattnall Journal, local newspaper

Cities in Georgia (U.S. state)
Cities in Tattnall County, Georgia